The U.S. Open 9-Ball Championship is an annual professional men's nine-ball pool tournament that began in its current form in 1976. The U.S. Open is one of the most sought-after titles in nine-ball and in pool generally. Traditionally, winners of the U.S. Open are given a green blazer and are awarded free entry fees to all future U.S. Open tournaments.

The Women's U.S. Open is a separate event, sanctioned by the Women's Professional Billiard Association (WPBA).

History 

In its first official edition in 1976, the U.S. Open was contested by just 16 players. Over the years, the number of participants steadily increased, reaching its current level of 256 players.

The tournament is an open to men, women and wheelchair users, making it a true "open" tournament, in that the only requirement to play in the event is the payment of the entry fee. The total purse for the tournament is $300,000, where the winner is awarded $50,000.

The tournament's original venue was Q-Master Billiards pool hall, in Norfolk, Virginia, which hosted the event, other than one year, from 1976 until 1988. From 1997 to 2011, the U.S. Open Men's Division was held at the Chesapeake Conference Center in Chesapeake, Virginia. Q-Masters is still involved in the tournament.

Original promoter Barry Behrman died on April 23, 2016. His children, Brady Behrman and Shannon Behrman Paschall, took over operating the tournament until 2018, when it was sold to Matchroom Pool.

Format 
The tournament format is essentially double-elimination (a player is out of the tournament after losing two ) until two players remain. Most professional pool "double-elimination" events, however, are not true double-elimination formats, where the player who reaches the finals from the loser's side has to defeat the winner's side player twice for the title.

As of 2019, the tournament reverts to single-elimination from the last 16 onwards. However, the final match, as is customary with most professional nine-ball tournaments today, is one extended race. At the U.S. Open, the extended race in the finals is 13 racks.

Winners

Men

Records 
 Earl Strickland and Shane Van Boening, both from the U.S., share the record for winning the U.S. Open 9-Ball Championship the most times: five. Strickland in (1984, 1987, 1993, 1997, 2000). Van Boening in (2007, 2012, 2013, 2014, 2016).
 Van Boening holds the record for the most consecutive wins: three. (2012, 2013, 2014).
 The oldest pool player to ever win the men's tournament to date is Mike Lebrón of Puerto Rico, at 54 years old. The youngest player to win to date is Joshua Filler of Germany, at 21 years old.

Top Performers

 Active participants are shown in bold.
 Only players who reached the final are included.
 Final stage appearances relates to players who reach the last 12 players of the event. As of 2019, final stages include last 16 players, due to format change.
 In the event of identical records, players are sorted in alphabetical order by first name.

Women 
Unlike the men's tournament, the U.S. Open is not a true "open" event. Each female player must qualify through the Women's Professional Billiard Association (WPBA), the professional women's billiards tour based in the United States, in order to compete in this annual event.

References

1976 establishments in the United States
Cue sports in the United States
Pool competitions
Recurring sporting events established in 1976
Sports competitions in the United States